This is a list of political officeholders from works of fiction. It includes links to standalone lists of fictional U.S. presidents, U.S. vice presidents, U.S. presidential candidates, British prime ministers, British monarchs, and British politicians.

Mayors 
 Unnamed Mayor (Michael Murphy) of Gotham City – Batman Returns 
 The Mayor – Halloweentown, The Nightmare Before Christmas
 The Mayor (James Gandolfini) – New York City, The Taking of Pelham 123 (2009 Remake)
 The Mayor (Lionel Atwill) – Vasaria, Frankenstein Meets the Wolf Man
District 11 Mayor (Afemo Omilami), District 11, The Hunger Games
 Mayor Richard Adar (David Eick, Colm Feore), Battlestar Galactica
 Mayor "Al" (Lee Wallace) – D-New York City, The Taking of Pelham One Two Three
 Mayor John Amalfi – New York City, "Cities in Flight" short stories and novel series Science fiction, by James Blish
 Mayor Amelia (Susan Roman) - Kattelox Island, Mega Man Legends
 Mayor Frank Berkowitz (Sonny Bono) – Metropolis, Superman comics and Lois & Clark: The New Adventures of Superman
 Mayor Blank – The City, USA, The Tick animated series
 Mayor Johnny "The Mayor" Bledsoe – Hill Valley, The Oblongs
 Mayor Borg (Lee Wallace) – Gotham City – Batman, 1989 film
 Mayor Sergio Bustamante (Boy Olmi) – Buenos Aires, Rebelde Way
 Mayor Joe Camels – Sto Lat, Going Postal (Discworld)
 Mayor Thomas J. Carcetti (Aidan Gillen), D-Baltimore, The Wire
 Mayor Lou Carpenter, former Mayor of Erinsborough in Neighbours
 Mayor Cavanaugh – New York City, CSI: Cyber
 Mayor Oswald Cobblepot – Gotham City, The Batman Adventures
 Mayor Dominic Da Vinci (Nicholas Campbell) – Vancouver, British Columbia – Da Vinci's City Hall
 Mayor Richard Dellasandro (Eric Roberts) - Los Angeles, California, Pandemic (2007)
 Mayor Daniel Dickerson – Gotham City, Batman comics
 Mayor Roger Doofenshmirtz — Danville (in the Tri-state Area), Phineas and Ferb 
 Mayor Ebert (Michael Lerner) – New York City, Godzilla movie
 Mayor Pablo Herrera (Carlos Larrañaga) – Encinar de la Torre, Señor alcalde
 Mayor Paco (Miguel Ángel Silvestre) – Pedraza, 30 Coins
 Mayor Philip Fitzhugh – Recess
 Mayor Anthony Garcia (Nestor Carbonell) – Gotham City, The Dark Knight and The Dark Knight Rises
 Mayor Garry “Jerry” Gergich (Jim O'Heir) — Pawnee, Indiana, Parks and Recreation
 Mayor Marion Grange (Adam West) – D-Gotham City, Batman comics and The Batman animated series (note: Grange is female in the comics, but male in the cartoon)
 Mayor Peter Griffin (Seth MacFarlane) – New Quahog, Family Guy (episode "Da Boom")
 Mayor Grim – Bad Blintz, The Amazing Maurice and His Educated Rodents (Discworld)
 Mayor Walter Gunderson (Bill Murray) — Pawnee, Indiana, Parks and Recreation
 Mayor Mike Haggar – Metro City, New York, Final Fight
 Mayor Douglas "Doug" Hamilton (Steven Weber) – R-New Orleans, Louisiana, NCIS: New Orleans
 Mayor Jonas Henderson (Thomas Mitchell) – Hadleyville, New Mexico, High Noon
 Mayor Kate Hennings (Candice Bergen) – New York City, Sweet Home Alabama
 Mayor Hamilton Hill (Lloyd Bochner) – Gotham City, Batman comics and Batman: The Animated Series
 Mayor Roger C. Hole – Liberty City, Grand Theft Auto: Liberty City Stories
 Mayor Mitchell Hundred – New York City, Ex Machina (comic book)
 Mayor J. Jonah Jameson- New York City, Spider-Man comics
 Mayor Tom Kane – Chicago, Boss television series
 Mayor Armand Krol – R-Gotham City, Batman comics
 Mayor Victor Lang (John Slattery) – Fairview, Desperate Housewives
 Mayor Lenny (David Margulies) – New York City, Ghostbusters and Ghostbusters II
 Miss Liberty (Jane Lapotaire) – Blackbury, Johnny and the Dead (actually Chairman of the Blackbury Municipal Authority)
 Mayor Bruce Lincoln (Charles S. Dutton) – New York City, Aftershock: Earthquake in New York
 Mayor Linseed (Byron Keith) – Gotham City, Batman, 1960s TV series
 Mayor Dick Livingstone – Ubergurgl, The Amazing Maurice and His Educated Rodents (Discworld)
 Mayor Dorian Lord (Robin Strasser) – Llanview–, One Life to Live
 Mayor Doug MacKenzie (Gareth Hale) –Charnham, Family Affairs
 Mayor Maynot – The Neitherworld – Bettlejuice, TV series
 Mayor Augustus May-who – Whoville, How the Grinch Stole Christmas!
 "The Mayor" – Townsville, The Powerpuff Girls
 Mayor McCheese – McDonald's advertisements
 Mayor McDaniels – South Park, Colorado
 Mayor Modest (Walter De Donder) – unknown village in Belgium, Samson en Gert (rarely called by his real name, mostly just Meneer de Burgemeester (Mr. Mayor))
 Mayor Miles O'Donovan – Liberty City, Grand Theft Auto: Liberty City Stories
 Mayor Jack O'Leary (Don Ameche) – Chicago, In Old Chicago
 Mayor John Pappas (Al Pacino) – New York City, City Hall
 Mayor Pinky (Rob Paulsen) – Shiny Pants, Pinky and the Brain; later elected president
 Mayor Carter Poole (David Ramsey) – New York City, Blue Bloods
 Mayor C. Randall Poopenmeyer (David Herman), New New York City, Earth, Futurama
 Mayor Oliver Queen – Star City, DC Comics
 Mayor Diamond Joe Quimby (Dan Castellaneta) – D-Springfield, The Simpsons
 Mayor Leon Quiñones (Desi Arnaz), The Escape Artist
 Mayor Sonya Rebecchi, Mayor of Erinsborough in Neighbours
 Mayor Paul Robinson, former Mayor of Erinsborough in Neighbours
 Mayor Clarence V. Royce (Glynn Turman), D-Baltimore, The Wire
 Mayor Bradford Sackett – Metropolis, Superman comics
 Mayor Steven Sautter – New York City, Shadowhawk comic (Volume III, #3)
 Mayor Henry Scudder (Henry Roquemore) – Cleardale, Young Fugitives
 Mayor Homer Simpson – New Springfield, The Simpsons
 Mayor Frank Skeffington – Spencer Tracy, The Last Hurrah
 Mayor Zahra Taylor (Amanda Warren) – D-New Orleans, Louisiana, NCIS: New Orleans
 Mayor Robert Underdunk Terwilliger (Kelsey Grammer) – R-Springfield, The Simpsons
Mayor Undersee - District 12, The Hunger Games
Mayor Lipp - District 12, The Ballad of Songbirds and Snakes
 Mayor "Red" Thomas – 1955 Hill Valley, Back to the Future
 Mayor Rachel Wando (Linda Hamilton) – Dante's Peak, Washington, Dante's Peak
 Mayor Adam West (Adam West) – Quahog, Rhode Island, Family Guy
 Mayor Josh West, former Mayor of Summer Bay in Home and Away
 Mayoress Dame Christabel Wickham (Lucy Robinson) – Gasford, The Thin Blue Line
 Mayor Richard Wilkins III (Harry Groener) – Sunnydale, Buffy the Vampire Slayer
 Mayor "Goldie" Wilson – 1985 Hill Valley, Back to the Future
 Mayor Winder (Paul Birch) – The Man Who Shot Liberty Valance
 Mayor Randall Winston (Barry Bostwick) – D-New York City, Spin City sitcom
 Mayor Tortimer – player's town – Animal Crossing
 Mayor Bill Dewey – Beach City, Steven Universe
 Mayor Eustace "Huckabone" Befufftlefumpter – Gravity Falls
 Mayor Tyler Cutebiker – Gravity Falls
 Mayor Leodore Lionheart – Zootopia

Attorneys general

United States
 Attorney General Joanna Doyle (Eva Marie Saint) – ?- Wisconsin, Frasier
 Attorney General Daniel Larson (Sherry Houston), The West Wing
 Attorney General Alan Fisk (Dylan Baker) – D-Mississippi, The West Wing
 Attorney General Oliver Babish (Oliver Platt) – D-Illinois, The West Wing
 Attorney General Mary Campbell (Anna Deavere Smith), Madam Secretary
 Attorney General Louise Cronenberg (Leslie Hendrix), Madam Secretary
 Attorney General Nolan (John Bolton), Madam Secretary
 Attorney General Martha Wilson (Ellen Harvey) – D-?, House of Cards
 Attorney General Hoberman (Barbara Rosenblat) – D-?, Homeland

United Kingdom
 Attorney General George Matherson (Richard McCabe), Eye in the Sky

Governors

United States
 Governor Mary Bailey (Maggie Roswell) – D-Springfield's state, The Simpsons
 Governor Eric Baker (Ed O'Neill) – D-Pennsylvania, The West Wing
 Governor Josiah Bartlet (Martin Sheen) – D-New Hampshire, The West Wing
 Governor Sam Culver (John McIntire) – Texas, Dallas (1978 TV series)
 Governor Linda Danvers – Florida In an "imaginary tale" set in a possible future in Superman Family issue #200, Supergirl, now known as Superwoman, is depicted as being the Governor of Florida in her secret identity of Linda Danvers.
 Governor Samuel "Sam" Denning (Richard T. Jones) – Hawaii, Hawaii Five-0
 Governor James Devlin (Željko Ivanek) - R-"The State", Oz
 Governor Al Donnelly – (Tim Matheson) – Washington, Black Sheep
 Governor Bob Dunston – (Tracy Morgan) – Alabama, 30 Rock ("Governor Dunston")
 Governor Fido – D, Spitting Image
 Governor Kevin – "The State", Teamo Supremo
 Tri-Governor Heinz Doofenshmirtz (Dan Povenmire) – Phineas and Ferb ("Last Day of Summer")
 Governor Eugene Gatling (James Noble) – Connecticut, Benson
 Governor Jim W. Gettys (Ray Collins) – New York, Citizen Kane
 Governor Eleanor Grant (Marsha Mason) – California, Nick of Time
 Governor Conrad Grayson (Henry Czerny) – New York, Revenge
 Governor Jerry Haskins (Seymour Cassel) – New Mexico, Convoy
 Governor Jack Hathaway (William Petersen) – D-Virginia, The Contender
 Governor Hubert Happy Hopper (Guy Kibbee) – state unknown, Mr. Smith goes to Washington
 Governor Paul Jameson (Richard Denning) – Hawaii, Hawaii Five-O
 Governor Patricia "Pat" Jameson (Jean Smart) – Hawaii, Hawaii Five-O
 Governor Gertrude Lang (Joanna Gleason) – Oregon, Mr Holland's Opus
 Governor William J. LePetomaine (Mel Brooks) – Western territory, Blazing Saddles
 Governor Lewis (Dan Aykroyd) – Glen Canyon, Arizona – Evolution
 Governor Caleb Lockwood (Peter Gerety) – Texas – Madam Secretary
 Governor John "Jack" Longfellow – R-Maine, John Batchelor's novel Father's Day
 Governor Robert McCallister – R-Missouri, Jack & Bobby
 Governor Sam McConaughey (Steven Weber) – Texas, Dallas (2012 TV series)
 Governor Daniel McGinty (Brian Donlevy), The Great McGinty
 Governor John J. McKay (Melvyn Douglas) – D-California, The Candidate
 Governor George McRyan – Pennsylvania, Blow Out
 Governor Charles Norin – (Scott Williamson) – Virginia, NCIS
 Governor Maria Nunez – D – Florida – Commander in Chief
 Governor Menelaus "Pappy" O'Daniel (Charles Durning) – Mississippi – O Brother, Where Art Thou?
 Governor Orlando Ozio – D-New York, Primary Colors
 Governor Fred Picker (Larry Hagman) – D-Florida, Primary Colors
 Governor James Reynolds Pryce (Tom Selleck) – D-Michigan, Running Mates
 Governor Robert Ritchie (James Brolin) – R-Florida, The West Wing
 Governor Lillian Schaefer (Faye Dunaway) - California, Pandemic (2007)
 Governor Donald Shalvoy (Tom Everett Scott) – New York, Law & Order
 Governor Jack Stanton (John Travolta) – D-Southern state, Primary Colors
 Governor Willie Stark (Broderick Crawford) later (Sean Penn) – Southern state, All the King's Men
 Governor Bill Sterling, Sr. (James Whitmore) – D-California, Mister Sterling
 Governor Ray Sullivan (Brett Cullen) – R-West Virginia, The West Wing
 Governor Clinton Tyree – D-Florida, Double Whammy by Carl Hiaasen
 Governor Evelyn Tracy – (Christine Ebersole) – Washington, Black Sheep
 Governor Jim Wade (William Powell) – New York, Manhattan Melodrama
 Governor Carla Williams – (Rebecca Jenkins) – California, 10.5
 Governor Leslie Knope (Amy Poehler) – D-Indiana, Parks And Recreation
 Governor Lew Edwards (Richard Crenna) – California, Jade
Governor James Royce (Michael Gaston) – Michigan, Designated Survivor

The Caribbean
 Governor Elaine Marley – Tri-Island Area, Monkey Island
 Governor Weatherby Swann (Jonathan Pryce) – Jamaica, Pirates of the Caribbean trilogy

Elsewhere
 Governor, The – Pokey the Penguin
 Governor Wilhuff Tarkin (Peter Cushing) – the Outer Rim territories, Star Wars

Congresspersons 
 Congressman Sam Albert – Enemy of the State
 Congressman Albert Alger (John Michael Higgins) – The Thick of It (US version)
 Congresswoman Mackenzie Allen (Geena Davis) – I-Connecticut, Commander in Chief
 Congressman Clayton Ashford – R-Mississippi, Lash-Up (2015 novel by Larry Bond)
 Congressman Bob Arnold – corrupt politician expelled from the House, Springfield's state, The Simpsons
 Congressman Beauregard – The Simpsons
 Congressman Bob Bercolini – D-Pennsylvania, deceased, Capitol Venture, a novel by Barbara Mikulski
 Congresswoman Elizabeth Blake – Illinois, House Committee for Lunar Programs Chairman, No Man's World (1967 novel by Martin Caidin)
 Congressman Regina Bookman (Queen Latifah) – Democrat, (30 Rock)
 Congressman Button Gwinnett Brown – (Lee Tracy), Washington Merry-Go-Round
 Congresswoman Brown – Y: The Last Man
 Congressman Jason Bruce – New York, Shadowhawk comic (Volume III, #3)
 Congressman Rob Cole -(David Doty) Delaware- Legally Blonde 2: Red, White & Blonde
 Congresswoman Lacey Davenport – R-California, Doonesbury
 Congressman Davis (Len Wein) – X-Men Days of Future Past
 Congresswoman DeLong - state unknown  - JAG
 Congressman Mac Dickinson – D-California, Your Fathers, Where Are They? And the Prophets, Do They Live Forever? by Dave Eggers
 Speaker of the House of Representatives Roger Donovan (R – Kentucky) An Unprovoked Attack by F.J. McNally
 Congressman Doyle (Hal Holbrook) – The Majestic
 Congressman Ray Fuchs-(James Newman)- state unknown-Legally Blonde 2: Red, White & Blonde
Congressman Roger Furlong (Dan Bakkedahl; Ohio) – Veep
 Congressman John Ambrose Fauntroy (Larry Peterson) – C.S.A.: The Confederate States of America
 Congressman John Ambrose Fauntroy II (Larry Peterson) – C.S.A.: The Confederate States of America
 Congresswoman Barbara Gordon – Batman
 Congresswoman Flora Hamburger-Blackford – Harry Turtledove's Southern Victory Series
 Congressman Cullee Hamilton – California, The Throne of Saturn by Allen Drury
 Congresswoman Libby Hauser (Dana Ivey)- D-Texas-, Legally Blonde 2: Red, White & Blonde
 Congressman Christopher "Chris" Higgins – House Armed Services Committee Chairman, Letter 44 (comic book series)
 Speaker Topper Huggins (D) – The People's Choice
 Representative B. Jamison - JAG
 Congressman Thomas Jefferson "Jeff" Johnson (Eddie Murphy) – D-Florida, The Distinguished Gentleman
 Congressman Johnson – The Story of Will Rogers
 Congressman Herschel Krustofski – R-Springfield's state, The Simpsons
 Congresswoman Madeline Kroft (Ruth Williamson)-state unknown- Legally Blonde 2: Red, White & Blonde
 Congresswoman Bobbi Latham (Anne-Marie Johnson) - state unknown  - JAG
 Congresswoman Sally LeRoy – California, Wild in the Streets
 Congressman Robert A. Longo – D-Louisiana, No Man's World
 Congressman Stanford Marks (Bruce McGill) – R – Alabama -, Legally Blonde 2: Red, White & Blonde
 Congressman G. Martin (Raymond O'Keefe) - JAG
 Congressman Jack McCallister – D-Missouri, Jack & Bobby
 Congressman Robert McCallister – D, later R-Missouri, Jack & Bobby
 Congressman McCarter (Francois Paquette) – X-Men Days of Future Past
 Congressman Dan "Mac" McLane – Louisiana, NCIS
 Congressman McCoy – state and party unknown – Introduces Bill in "I'm Just a Bill" – Schoolhouse Rock
 Congressman Rick Nussbaum – Republican – House Armed Services Committee Chairman, Lash-Up
 Congressman Parker (Chris Claremont) – X-Men Days of Future Past
 Congressman Nathan Petrelli – New York, Heroes
 Congressman Israel Pond – Countdown (1970 novel by Frank G. Slaughter)
 Congressman Thad Preston – Democrat – House Minority Leader, Lash-Up
 Congressman Colin Pryce (Nicolas Cage) - D-Louisiana - The Runner
 Congresswoman Victoria Rudd – Massachusetts (Sally Field), Legally Blonde 2: Red, White & Blonde
 Congressman Raymond Shaw (Liev Schreiber) – New York, The Manchurian Candidate
 Congressman Sheldon Runyon (Gary Oldman) – R-Illinois, The Contender
 Congressman Thomas K. "Tom" Rutledge – D-Nebraska, Lash-Up
 Congressman James L. Satterthwaite – Wyoming, The Throne of Saturn
 Congressman Alex Shrub – R-Florida, Grand Theft Auto: Vice City
 Congressman Greg Stillson – The Dead Zone
 Congressman Austin Stoneman – The Birth of a Nation
 Congressman Robert Sullivan - Minnesota, The District
 Congressman Thomas "Tom" Stubbs III – Grand Theft Auto: The Lost and Damned
 Congressman Jack Tanner (Michael Murphy) – D-Michigan, Tanner '88
 Congressman Nathan Templeton, Speaker of the House (Donald Sutherland) – R-Florida, Commander in Chief
 Congressman Bernard Terpak – Democrat – Speaker of the House, Lash-Up
 Congressman Allan Trumbull – Speaker of the House, Olympus Has Fallen
 Congressman John Vassar – The Fall of a Nation
 Congressman Reginald Webster (Christian Slater) – D-Delaware, The Contender
 Congressman Horace Wilcox – Springfield's state, deceased, The Simpsons
 Congressman Williams (Stephen Kearney) - JAG
 Congressman Ben Wyatt – (D) IN-10 (later IN-09), Parks and Recreation
 Congressman David Dilbeck (Burt Reynolds) – Florida, Striptease

Senators

United States

Democratic senators 
 Senator Carly Armiston (Cynthia Nixon) – New York, Alpha House
 Senator Joseph Bidet – Spitting Image
 Senator Samuel S. Chapman (Charles Durning), The Final Countdown
 State Senator Clayton Davis (Isiah Whitlock, Jr.) Baltimore City, The Wire
 Senator Lillian DeHaven (Anne Bancroft) – Texas, G.I. Jane
 Senator Rock DeRickey – Spitting Image
 Senator Rosalyn DuPeche (Wanda Sykes) – Illinois, Alpha House
 Senator John Ambrose Fauntroy V (Larry Peterson) – Virginia, C.S.A.: The Confederate States of America
 Senator June Finch (Holly Hunter) – Kentucky, Batman v Superman: Dawn of Justice
 Senator Ortolan Finistirre (William H. Macy) – Vermont, Thank You for Smoking
 Senator Ellen Fischer – California, A Time to Run
 Senator Parker Gable (Robert Culp) – Running Mates
 Senator Gary Garthington – Spitting Image
 Senator Eleanor Gorzack – Pennsylvania, Capitol Venture by Barbara Mikulski
 Senator Laine Hanson (Joan Allen) – Ohio, The Contender
 Senator Clarence Helmsley (Edward See) – Vermont, C.S.A.: The Confederate States of America
 Senator Henry McGuire (Bob Sweeney) – Arkansas, Starfire (1960 novel by Robert Buckner) / Moon Pilot (1962 film)
 Senator Bill McKay (Robert Redford) – California, The Candidate
 Senator Douglas Monroe – Ohio, The Walking Dead
 Senator Brickley Paiste (Gore Vidal) – Pennsylvania, Bob Roberts
 Senator Charles Palantine (Leonard Harris) – New York, Taxi Driver
 Senator David Palmer (Dennis Haysbert) – Maryland, 24
 Senator Terrence Randall (Bob Gunton) – Colorado, Running Mates
 Senator Pete Ross – Kansas, Superman
 Senator Harry Rutledge (Daniel Pilon) – Shoot 'Em Up
 Senator Tom Rutledge – Kentucky, Lash-Up (2001 novella by Larry Bond)
 Senator Joseph Tynan (Alan Alda) – New York, The Seduction of Joe Tynan
 Senator John Waltzer – Virginia, Mission: Impossible
Senator Tom Wright (Joe Morton) – New Jersey, House

Republican senators 
 Senator Jack Bowman (Mark Deklin) - Montana, Designated Survivor
 Senator Robert Bettencourt (Clark Johnson) – Pennsylvania, Alpha House
 Senator Gil John Biggs (John Goodman) – North Carolina, Alpha House
 Senator Maureen Gaylord – Executive Privilege by Phillip Margolin
 Senator Andy Guzman (Mark Consuelos) – Florida, Alpha House
 Senator Crocker Jarmon (Don Porter) – California, The Candidate
 Senator Alex P. Keaton (Michael J. Fox) – Ohio, Spin City
 Senator John Keeler (Geoff Pierson) – 24
 Senator Kevin Keeley (Gene Hackman) – 'The Birdcage
 Senator Louis Laffer (Matt Malloy) – Nevada, Alpha House
 Senator Robert McCallister (Rob Lowe) – California, Brothers & Sisters
 Senator Mitchell Morris (Bruce McGill) – Texas, Running Mates
 Senator Dennis Morganthal – Missouri, Jack & Bobby
 Senator Judson Pilager (Michael Murphy) – R-Colorado, Silver City
 Senator Jim Proust – The Third Twin
 Senator Bob Roberts (Tim Robbins) – Pennsylvania, Bob Roberts
 Senator Lister Ames Rosewater - Indiana, God Bless You, Mr. Rosewater
 Senator Bob Rumson (Richard Dreyfuss) – Kansas, The American President
 Senator Mary Ellen Spinkle (Christine Baranski) – Marci X
 Senator Hubert S. Toombs (Richard Herman) – Georgia, C.S.A.: The Confederate States of America
 Senator Arnold Vinick – California, The West Wing
 Senator Christian Ward (Tim DeKay) – Massachusetts – Marvel's Agents of S.H.I.E.L.D.

Other parties 
 Senator Howell Tankerbell (Bob Odenkirk) – Dixiecrat, Mr. Show with Bob and David

Unknown affiliations 
 Senator Steven Abercombie III (John Getz) – California, A Day Without a Mexican
 Senator Elizabeth Ames Adams – Kansas, Advise and Consent
 Senator Dale Lee Agsby (Simon Kunz) – Brass Eye
 Senator Allbright (Ed Begley) – Wild in the Streets
 Senator Brigham Anderson – Utah, Advise and Consent
 Senator Alan Armstrong (Christopher McDonald) – California, SGU Stargate Universe
 Senator Steven Armstrong (Alastair Duncan) – Colorado, Metal Gear Rising: Revengeance
 Senator Melvin G. Ashton (William Powell) – The Senator Was Indiscreet
 Senator Tom August – Minnesota, Advise and Consent
 Senator Henry Babcock – (Thurston Hall) – Sherlock Holmes in Washington
 Senator Elliot Baines (James Cromwell) – Washington, Citizen Baines
 Senator Barrington (James Karen) - JAG
 Senator John "Bluto" Blutarsky (John Belushi) – National Lampoon's Animal House
 Senator Senator Wyndom Brody (Bruce Boxleitner), Decompression, an episode of The Outer Limits
 Senator Brickman (Michael Lerner) – X-Men Days of Future Past
 Senator Helen Brucker (Stacey Travis) – California, Angel
 Senator J. Billington Bulworth (Warren Beatty)- California, Bulworth
 Senator Charlotte Burton (Lauren Holly)- New York, Alphas
 Senator Beauregard Claghorn (Kenny Delmar) – Southerner, The Fred Allen Show
 Senator Colby (Berton Churchill) – Illinois, In Old Chicago
 Senator Jeffrey Collins (John Allen Nelson), Vanished
 Senator Seabright B. Cooley – South Carolina, Advise and Consent
 Senator Stanley Danta – Connecticut, Advise and Consent
 Senator John DeWilton – Vermont, Advise and Consent
 Senator Billy Doggs – Tennessee, The People's Choice
 Senator Johnny Fergus (Hal Holbrook) – California, Wild in the Streets
 Senator Ralph Fellows – California, Senate Minority Leader, The Pilgrim Project (1964 novel by Hank Searls)
 Senator Harrison Fisher – The Dead Zone
 Senator Hal Fry – West Virginia, Advise and Consent
 Senator Ross Garrison, Person of Interest
 Senator Pat Geary (G. D. Spradlin) – Nevada, The Godfather Part II
 Senator Jefferson Davis Graham – New York, Girl Meets World
 Senator Grant (John Hamilton) – The Great Man's Lady
 Senator Ted Greenfield (Charles Trowbridge) – The Great Lie
 Senator Phil Hammersleigh (Jason Robards) – Enemy of the State
 Senator Powell Hanson – North Dakota, Advise and Consent
 Senator Lawrence Harris (Kevin Cooney), Primary Colors
 Senator Huyler (William Farnum), Tennessee Johnson 
 Senator John Iselin (James Gregory), The Manchurian Candidate
 Senator Edward H. "Big Ed" Jones (Thurston Hall) – Wilson
 Senator Thomas Jordan (Jon Voight) – The Manchurian Candidate
 Senator Robert Kelly (Bruce Davison) – X-Men comics and film
 Senator Martha Kent (Annette O'Toole) – Kansas, Smallville
 Senator Patrick Kiley (Tim DeKay) – NCIS
 Senator Orrin Knox – Illinois, Advise and Consent
 Senator Ed Lauterback (Pierre Watkin) – State of the Union
 Senator Randolph K. Lindle – Kansas, Dreadful Sanctuary (1948 novel by Eric Frank Russell)
 Senator Lockhart (John Getz) – California, NCIS: Los Angeles
 Senator MacVickers (Harry Davenport) – Government Girl
 Senator Aaron McComb (Ron Silver) – Timecop
 Senator Marquand (Fritz Hollings) – City Hall
 Senator Charles Martin (Chelcie Ross), Primary Colors
 Senator Ruth Martin (Diane Baker) – Tennessee, The Silence of the Lambs
 Senator Richard Matheson (Raymond J. Barry) – The X-Files
 Senator Horace Maydew (Berton Churchill) – Kentucky, Judge Priest
 Senator Jackson McCanles (Lionel Barrymore) – Texas, Duel in the Sun
 Senator Aaron McComb (Ron Silver) – Timecop
 Senator Mendoza – The House of the Scorpion
 Senator Morton (Leo G. Carroll) – Strangers on a Train
 Senator Roy Mullholland – Michigan, Advise and Consent
 Senator Robert Durham Munson – Michigan, Advise and Consent
 Senator Ellen Nadeer (Parminder Nagra), Agents of S.H.I.E.L.D.
 Senator Edward T. Norton (Alan Dinehart) – Washington Merry-Go-Round
 Senator John Neal (Craig T. Nelson) – Wag the Dog
 Senator Maria Nunez (Sally Shamrell) - South Carolina, Agents of S.H.I.E.L.D.
 Senator Denise O'Hara (Bess Armstrong), NCIS
 Senator Dick Osborne (Sam Anderson) – California, NCIS: Los Angeles
 Senator Francis Owen, No Man's World (1967 novel by Martin Caidin)
 Senator Joseph Harrison Paine (Claude Rains) – Mr. Smith Goes to Washington
 Senator Neptune Perkins – D-Hawaii – DC Comics
 Senator William Powers (John Forsythe) – The Powers That Be
 Senator Silas P. Ratcliffe – Illinois, Democracy: An American Novel
 Senator Carlton Riley – Missouri, The Affair
 Senator Timothy Roberts (Dudley Digges) – Alexander Hamilton
 Senator Judson Ross (James Cromwell) – Virginia, Species II
 Senator Sedgewick Sexton – Delaware, Deception Point
 Senator Eleanor Prentice Shaw (Meryl Streep) – Virginia, The Manchurian Candidate
 Senator John Shaw (Dan Olmstead) – Virginia, The Manchurian Candidate
 Senator Jefferson Smith (James Stewart) – Mr. Smith Goes to Washington
 Senator Lafe Smith – Iowa, Advise and Consent
 Senator Bill Sterling, Jr. (Josh Brolin) – California, Mister Sterling
 Senator Ransom  Stoddard (James Stewart) – The Man Who Shot Liberty Valance
 Senator Hays Stowe (Hal Holbrook), The Bold Ones: The Senator
 Senator Warren Strickland – Idaho, Advise and Consent
 Senator Lars Todt – Countdown (1970 novel by Frank G. Slaughter)
 Senator Fred Van Ackerman – Wyoming, Advise and Consent
 Senator Bliss Wagoner – Alaska, Cities in Flight
 Senator Jim Waters (Charles Dingle) – Tennessee Johnson
 Senator Clarence Wannamaker – Montana, Advise and Consent
 Senator Wen (Ming-Na) – Eureka
 Senator Wylie (Walter Connolly) – Washington Merry-Go-Round
 Senator Gene Williams (Chuck McCollum) - Minnesota, Agents of S.H.I.E.L.D.
 Senator Kennicut "Kenny" Williams – Indiana, The Throne of Saturn
 Senator John Able Winthrop – Massachusetts, Advise and Consent and The Throne of Saturn
 Senator Eustace Womersley – Dreadful Sanctuary

Elsewhere
 Senator Decius Caecilius Metellus the Younger – Roman Senate, SPQR series novels by John Maddox Roberts
 Senator Mon Mothma – Star Wars
 Senator Palpatine (Ian McDiarmid) – Star Wars
 Gaius Ponarian (Patrick Fabian), Agents of S.H.I.E.L.D.

Presidents 

A to D
 President Datu Andrada (Joel de la Fuente) – Philippines, Madam Secretary episode "Break in Democracy"
 President Richard Adar (Lew Ayres) – The Twelve Colonies, Battlestar Galactica
 President Antonov – Soviet Union, Clive Cussler's Dirk Pitt novels
 President Jonathan Archer (Scott Bakula) – United Federation of Planets, Star Trek: Enterprise
 President Gaius Baltar (James Callis) – The Twelve Colonies, Battlestar Galactica
 President André Baptiste – Liberia, Lord of War
 President Josiah Bartlet – President in the drama series The West Wing
 President Tom Beck (Morgan Freeman) – Deep Impact
 Président Grace Bellanger (Anne Consigny) – French Republic, l'État de Grace
 Lord President Borusa (Leonard Sachs, Philip Latham) – Gallifrey, Doctor Who
 President Victor de Bourcey – European Union, Super-State (Brian Aldiss, 2002)
 Acting President Lucas Cabrera (Edu Manzano) – Philippines, Ang Probinsyano
 President/General Bill Carver (Anthony Ruivivar) – Texas, Revolution
 President Alma Coin (Julianne Moore) – District 13 (Part 1) and Panem (Part 2), The Hunger Games
 President Hillary Dafalong (Gloria Diaz) – Philippines, Ang Tanging Ina N'yong Lahat
 Lord President Doctor (Tom Baker, Peter Davison) – Gallifrey, Doctor Who (twice, abandoned office both times)
E to M

 President John Henry Eden (Malcolm McDowell), Fallout 3
 El Presidente, Tropico series
 President Rufus T. Firefly (Groucho Marx) – Freedonia, Duck Soup
 President George Formby – England, Thursday Next novels
 President Richard Graves (Nick Nolte) – Graves
 President Kelly Foster (Leslie Hope) – Georgia Federation, Revolution
 Hereditary President Sidney Harris – People's Republic of Haven, Honorverse
 President Oscar Hidalgo (Rowell Santiago) – Philippines, Ang Probinsyano
 President Sam Houston — Republic of Texas, The Difference Engine
 President Jaresh-Inyo (Herschel Sparber) – United Federation of Planets, Star Trek: Deep Space Nine
 President Harriet Jones – Great Britain, mentioned in the Doctor Who episode "Doomsday"
 President Kitenge – Pepsi presents New Zanzibar, The Simpsons
 President Joe Lawton, Grand Theft Auto IV
 President Lindberg – United Federated Territories, The Fifth Element
 President Funny Valentine, Steel Ball Run
 President Charles Logan – 24
 President James Marshall (Harrison Ford) – Air Force One
 President Agustín Mendilaharzu (Héctor Bidonde) - Los simuladores
 President Mon Mothma – Galactic Republic, Star Wars
 President/General Sebastian Monroe (David Lyons) – Monroe Republic, Revolution
 President Ina Montecillo (Ai-Ai delas Alas) – Philippines, Ang Tanging Ina N'yong Lahat
 President Muntu – Pepsi presents New Zanzibar, The Simpsons
M to Z
 President (formerly Major General) Brent Haywood, Republic of New Zealand, in Craig Harrison's Broken October (1976).
 President Napoleon – Animal Farm
 President Andrei Narmonov – Soviet Union – Ryanverse
 President Head of Richard Nixon – Futurama
 President Leia Organa-Solo – Galactic Republic, Star Wars
 President Pavel Ostrov (Olek Krupa) – Russia, Madam Secretary
 President Maria Ostrova (Angela Gots) – Russia, Madam Secretary
 President David Palmer – 24
 President Wayne Palmer – 24
 President/Commander Paylor (Patina Miller) - Panem, The Hunger Games
 Lord President Rassilon (Richard Mathews, Don Warrington, Timothy Dalton) – Gallifrey, Doctor Who
 President Laira Rillak (Chelah Horsdal) - Star Trek Discovery
 President Michael Rimmer (Peter Cook) – Great Britain, The Rise and Rise of Michael Rimmer
 Lady President Romana (Lalla Ward) – Gallifrey, various Doctor Who spin-offs
 President Laura Roslin (Mary McDonnell) – the Twelve Colonies, Battlestar Galactica
 President Arnold Schwarzenegger – Just Mentioned, Demolition Man
 President Najid Shiraz (Houshang Touzie) – Iran, Madam Secretary
 President Skroob (Mel Brooks) – Planet Spaceball, Spaceballs
 President Coriolanus Snow (Donald Sutherland) – Panem, The Hunger Games
 President Yuri Suvarov (Nick Jameson) – Russia, 24
 President Frank Underwood (Kevin Spacey) – House of Cards
 President Paulo Ventura (Domingos Montagner) - Brazil, O Brado Retumbante
 President Garrett Walker (Michael Gill) – House of Cards
 President Edmund Zuwanie (Earl Cameron) – Democratic Republic of Matobo, The Interpreter
Unnamed
 Unnamed Lord President (Llewellyn Rees) – Gallifrey, Doctor Who serial The Deadly Assassin
 Unnamed Federation President (Robert Ellenstein) – United Federation of Planets, Star Trek IV: The Voyage Home
 Unnamed President (Orlin Goranov) – Bulgaria, Mission London
 Unnamed Federation President (Kurtwood Smith) – United Federation of Planets, Star Trek VI: The Undiscovered Country
 Unnamed President (Don Warrington) – Great Britain, Doctor Who episode "Rise of the Cybermen"

Councillors 
 Councilwoman Elizabeth Alderman – New York, New Titans comics
 Alderman Thomas Bowler (George Baker) – Blackbury, Johnny and the Dead
 Councilman Thomas Carcetti (Aidan Gillen) – Baltimore, The Wire
 Councillor Degra – Xindi-Primates, Star Trek: Enterprise
 Councillor Duras (Patrick Massett)- Qo'noS, Star Trek: The Next Generation
 Councillor Jannar – Xindi-Arboreals, Star Trek: Enterprise
 Councillor Mallora – Xindi-Primates, Star Trek: Enterprise
 Councillor Charivretha zh'Thane – Andor, Deep Space Nine relaunch novels

Members of Parliament

Canadian Parliament
David J. Broadfoot MP (Dave Broadfoot) – New Apathetic Party – Kicking Horse Pass, Royal Canadian Air Farce
Nellie Gordon MP (Joanne Miller) – New Democratic Party – East Nova, Backbencher
Quentin Durgens MP (Gordon Pinsent) – Hampton County, Quentin Durgens, M.P.
Herb Proctor MP (Lee J. Campbell) – Conservative Party of Canada, Backbencher
Henri Villon MP – Liberal Party of Canada, Night Probe!

European Parliament
 Elisa Correr MEP – ALDE, Operation Red Dragon comic
 Imelda Kleist MEP (Brigitte Khan) – German Green Party-Obersaxony, The New Statesman
 Count Otto Von Munchweiller MEP (Benedick Blythe) – Obersaxony, The New Statesman
 Irina Vega MEP – Troubled Waters comic

Japanese Parliament
 Count Aritsune Hanakoji, Sakura Wars

Scottish Parliament

 Jim McClaren MSP (Tony Osoba) – SNP, Porridge, Life Beyond the Box: Norman Stanley Fletcher

Federal Assembly of the Socialist Federal Republic of Yugoslavia

 Ibrahim Salihović – League of Communists of Yugoslavia – Bosnia-Hercegovina, Between Mountains, novel by Maggie Helwig

United Kingdom

Thomas Shelby – MP for Birmingham South in TV show Peaky Blinders

Barbara Batten - MP for South Oxfordshire in Endeavour.

Julian Fawcett - Late Conservative MP of an unnamed seat in Ghosts.

Rachel Fawcett - daughter of Julian and Green MP of an unnamed seat in Ghosts.

First/prime ministers 

 First Minister Asarem Wadeen – Bajor, Deep Space Nine relaunch novels
Prime Minister Atkinson – Country League Party – New Zealand, Craig Harrison's Tomorrow Will Be A Lovely Day (1971) and Broken October (1976).
 Prime Minister Brian – New Zealand, Flight of the Conchords
 Prime Minister Hilda Fitzherbert – "Federated British Empire," Julius Vogel's Anno Domini 2000, or, Woman's Destiny (1889)
 Prime Minister Abdrahman Godzihkty – Kazakhstan, Peter Nevsky and the True Story of the Russian Moon Landing (1993 novel by John Calvin Batchelor)
 Prime Minister Gorgak – Trisol, Futurama
 First Minister Kalem Apren – Bajor, Star Trek: Deep Space Nine
 Prime Minister Yoko Kayabuki – Japan, Ghost in the Shell: Stand Alone Complex
 Prime Minister Douglas Kendrick – Country League Party – New Zealand, Craig Harrison's Tomorrow Will Be A Lovely Day (1971) and Broken October (1976).
 Prime Minister Kruel (Josef Swickard) – Oz, The Wizard of Oz
 Prime Minister Barrett Lindsay – Country League Party – New Zealand, Craig Harrison's Tomorrow Will Be A Lovely Day (1971) and Broken October (1976)
 Prime Minister Clark MacDonald (Wallace Shawn) – Canada, Canadian Bacon
 Prime Minister Thomas David McLaughlin (Paul Gross) – Canada, H2O
 Prime Minister Count Rupert Mountjoy (Peter Sellers) – Grand Fenwick, The Mouse That Roared
 Prime Minister Baron Von Neuhoff (Montagu Love) – Lichtenburg, The Son of Monte Cristo
 Prime Minister Birgitte Nyborg (Sidse Babett Knudsen) – Denmark, Borgen
 Premier Alexander Romanov – Soviet Union, Command & Conquer: Red Alert 2 computer game
 Prime Minister Charles Sarveaux – Canada, Night Probe!
 First Minister Shakaar Edon (Duncan Regehr) – Bajor, Star Trek: Deep Space Nine
 Prime Minister Allen Summervale, Duke of Cromarty – Star Kingdom of Manticore, Honorverse
 Prime Minister (effective dictator) Volkner – New Zealand, C. K. Stead's Smiths Dream (1971), filmed as Sleeping Dogs (1977)
 Acting First Minister Winn Adami (Louise Fletcher) – Bajor, Star Trek: Deep Space Nine

Cabinet secretaries, officers and ministers

United States
 Secretary of Energy Shirley Abbott (Dianne Wiest), Category 6: Day of Destruction
 Secretary of Defense David Brice (Gene Hackman), No Way Out
 Secretary of State Ellie Brilliard (April Grace), Behind Enemy Lines II: Axis of Evil
 Secretary of State Theodore "Theo" Burke, Ph.D., Zero-G, 2007 novel by Alton Gansky
 Secretary of State Hugh Cambridge, Lash-Up (2015 novel by Larry Bond)
 Secretary of State Jack Douglas (Nicholas Pryor), Executive Decision
 Secretary of Defense Preble Haugland, No Man's World (1967 novel by Martin Caidin)
 Secretary of Defense James Heller (William Devane), 24
 National Security Advisor Al "AJ" Johnson, Letter 44
 Secretary of Defense Sam Lane, DC Comics
 Secretary of State Elizabeth McCord (Téa Leoni), Madam Secretary
 Secretary of Defense Adrian Michter, Letter 44
 United States Attorney General Vincent Nash, Minority Report
 Secretary of Defense Everett Peck, Lash-Up (2001 novella and 2015 novel by Larry Bond)
 National Security Advisor Jeffrey Pelt (Richard Jordan), The Hunt for Red October
 Secretary of Education Jefferson Pierce, DC Comics
 Secretary of Defense Dell Rusk, Avengers
 Secretary of Metahuman Affairs Sarge Steel, DC Comics
 Secretary of Defense Lynne Warner (Sharon Gless), The State Within
 Secretary of Metahuman Affairs Amanda Waller, DC Comics
 Secretary of Defense Charles White (Len Cariou), Executive Decision
 Secretary of Defense Tony Stark, Iron Man
Secretary of State Thaddeus Ross, Captain America: Civil War (William Hurt)
 Secretary of Health and Human Services, Margaret Pierson, The Strain

Elsewhere
 Confederate States Secretary of State John Ambrose Fauntroy III (Larry Peterson) – CS, C.S.A.: The Confederate States of America
Sir Les Patterson, Minister for the Arts and Minister for Sport. Played by Barry Humphries in various media.
 Nathan Samuels (Harry Groener) – Earth, Star Trek: Enterprise
 Foreign Minister Hajjaj – Zuwayza, Darkness

Grand viziers 
 Abrim – Klatch, Sourcery (Discworld)
 Alhazared – Land of the Green Isles(King's Quest VI)
 Lord Hong – Agatean Empire, Interesting Times (Discworld)
 Iznogoud – from the television series of the same name
 Jafar – Agraba, Aladdin
 Nine-Turning-Mirrors – Agatean Empire, The Colour of Magic and Mort (Discworld)
 Sate Pestage – Galactic Empire, Star Wars
 Twoflower – Agatean Empire, Interesting Times (Discworld)

Ambassadors 

 Unnamed Ambassador – Ferrero Rocher advertisements
 Unnamed Ambassador – United States, Good Omens
 Spanish Ambassador – Spain, Madeline
 Ambassador Ludigan Abel – Ambassador of Trantor, a major empire ruling half a million worlds, in Isaac Asimov's The Currents of Space
 Ambassador Caithlin Dar – (Cynthia Gouw) Romulan Star Empire, Star Trek V: The Final Frontier
 Ambassador Curzon Dax – United Federation of Planets, Star Trek: Deep Space Nine
 Ambassador Delenn – Minbar, Babylon 5
 Ambassador G'Kar – Narn Regime, Babylon 5
 Ambassador Gregory (Henry Stephenson) – Russia, Rendezvous
 Ambassador Bill Harper (Will Rogers) – Sylvania, Ambassador Bill
 Ambassador K'Ehleyr – United Federation of Planets, Star Trek: The Next Generation
 Ambassador Kosh – Vorlon, Babylon 5
 Ambassador Londo Mollari – Centauri Republic, Babylon 5
 Ambassador Mourain (Ben Kingsley) – United States, "Rules of Engagement"
 Ambassador Noonan (Danielle Kennedy) – United States, "Narcos"
 Ambassador Park Jung-Soo – South Korea, Lie to Me television series
 Ambassador Sarek (Mark Lenard) – United Federation of Planets, Star Trek: The Original Series
 Ambassador Mickey Shea – The Godfather Returns
 Ambassador Spock (Leonard Nimoy) – United Federation of Planets, Star Trek: The Next Generation
 Ambassador Duncan Stewart – Australia, Embassy
 Ambassador St. John Talbot (David Warner) – United Federation of Planets, Star Trek V: The Final Frontier
 Ambassador Damien Thorn – United States, Omen III: The Final Conflict
 Ambassador Robert Thorn – United States, The Omen
 Ambassador His Grace Sir Samuel Vimes – Ankh-Morpork, The Fifth Elephant
 Ambassador Wikked (Otto Lederer) – Oz, The Wizard of Oz
 Ambassador Worf – United Federation of Planets, the final episode of Star Trek: Deep Space Nine and subsequent novels

Miscellaneous
 Antonius - Minister of Defense of Panem (Robert Knepper) - The Hunger Games
District Attorney Adair (Ray Collins) – Touch of Evil
 District Attorney Joseph Foster (Thomas Mitchell) – Alias Nick Beal
 District Attorney Galloway (Carl Frank) – The Lady from Shanghai
 District Attorney Thomas Mara (Jerome Cowan) – Miracle on 34th Street
 District Attorney Russell Quinton (Vincent Price) – Leave Her to Heaven
Egeria - Minister of Interior of Panem (Sarita Choudhury) - The Hunger Games: Mockingjay - Part 1
 George Papoon (by allusion, only), – candidate for "Chief Resident" under the National Surrealist Light People's Party, in Martian Space Party; a film by The Firesign Theatre. Audio from the staged nominating convention was then repurposed for the LP album, Not Insane or Anything You Want To. 
 Woody Boyd, Boston councilman in Cheers
 Vilos Cohaagen (Ronny Cox) – Mars Administrator in Total Recall
 Fred Davis (Albert Reed, Jr.) – dishonest alderman from Good Times
 Rachel Dawes, Assistant District Attorney in Batman Begins (played by Katie Holmes) and The Dark Knight (played by Maggie Gyllenhaal)
 Harvey Dent, District Attorney in Batman comics, 1989 film (played by Billy Dee Williams), and The Dark Knight (played by Aaron Eckhart)
 Colonel Sebastian Doyle (Craig Charles) – section chief of CGI, Head of the Ministry of Alteration, Dave Lister's fascist dictator alter ego in a drug-induced hallucination, Red Dwarf, Back To Reality
 Benson DuBois (Robert Guillaume), Budget Director and later Lieutenant Governor of unnamed New England state (presumably Connecticut) in the TV show Benson
 Borsk Fey'lya, Star Wars universe, career politician, eventual Chief of State of the New Republic
 Emmanuel Goldstein, former top member of the Party in Nineteen Eighty-Four
 Sir Martin Luther King Jr. – governor-general of the North American Union, a Canada-like nation consisting of all of North America less Alaska and including Baja California in the British Empire, The Two Georges by Harry Turtledove and Richard Dreyfuss (1996, novel)
 Commissioner Maurice (André Maranne) – Yes Minister: Party Games
 Ertuğrul Bey (Engin Altan Düzyatan and Tamer Yiğit)- Uç Bey of the Sultanate of Rum in Diriliş: Ertuğrul and Kuruluş: Osman.
 Havelock Vetinari – Patrician of Ankh-Morpork (Discworld)
 King Bradley – Fuhrer of Amestris in Fullmetal Alchemist
 Cornelius Fudge - Minister for Magic (Harry Potter)
 Rufus Scrimgeour - Minister for Magic (Harry Potter)
 Albus Dumbledore - Chief Warlock of the Wizengamot (Harry Potter)
 Kingsley Shacklebolt - Minister for Magic (Harry Potter)

See also 
 List of fictional political parties
 List of fictional presidents of the United States
 List of fictional prime ministers of the United Kingdom
 List of fictional British monarchs

References 
 

 
Politicians